Nixon's Corner is a small village in County Londonderry, Northern Ireland. In the 2001 Census it had a population of 201 people. It is situated within Derry and Strabane district.

Nixon's Corner was once the location of a British army border checkpoint installation prior to demilitarisation.

References 
NI Neighbourhood Information System

See also 

List of villages in Northern Ireland
List of towns in Northern Ireland

Villages in County Londonderry
Derry and Strabane district